The Women's short race at the 2003 IAAF World Cross Country Championships was held at the L'Institut Équestre National in Avenches near Lausanne, Switzerland, on March 30, 2003.  Reports of the event were given in The New York Times, in the Herald, and for the IAAF.

Complete results for individuals, for teams, medallists, and the results of British athletes who took part were published.

Race results

Women's short race (4.03 km)

Individual

†: Asmae Leghzaoui from  finished 12th in 13:05 min, but was disqualified.

Teams

Note: Athletes in parentheses did not score for the team result (n/s: nonscorer)

Participation
According to an unofficial count, 99 athletes from 28 countries participated in the Women's short race.  The announced athlete from  did not show.

 (1)
 (6)
 (1)
 (4)
 (5)
 (1)
 (1)
 (1)
 (6)
 (5)
 (6)
 (5)
 (1)
 (5)
 (1)
 (1)
 (6)
 (4)
 (6)
 (6)
 (6)
 (5)
 (1)
 (1)
 (6)
 (5)
 (2)
 (1)

See also
 2003 IAAF World Cross Country Championships – Senior men's race
 2003 IAAF World Cross Country Championships – Men's short race
 2003 IAAF World Cross Country Championships – Junior men's race
 2003 IAAF World Cross Country Championships – Senior women's race
 2003 IAAF World Cross Country Championships – Junior women's race

References

Women's short race at the IAAF World Cross Country Championships
IAAF World Cross Country Championships
2003 in women's athletics